Morula japonica is a species of sea snail, a marine gastropod mollusk in the family Muricidae, the murex snails or rock snails.

Description

Distribution
This marine species occurs off Japan.

References

 Smith, E. A. (1909). List of Mollusca from Christmas Island, Indian Ocean. Proceedings of the Malacological Society of London. 8: 369–372.

Externazl links
 Sowerby, G. B., III. (1903). Descriptions of fourteen new species of marine molluscs from Japan. Annals and Magazine of Natural History, Series 7. 12: 496-501

japonica
Gastropods described in 1903